Michael Stanley Kirby (1931 – February 24, 1997) was a professor of drama at New York University. He wrote several groundbreaking books, including Happenings, Futurist Performance and The Art of Time. He was editor of The Drama Review from 1969 to 1986.

Although he taught at NYU simultaneously with Richard Schechner and shared an interest in avant-garde performance, he disagreed with Schechner about what should appear in TDR and about the value of the field that was emerging at the time, performance studies. Kirby believed theatrical events should be documented, not criticized or analyzed using the tools of social sciences.

He studied at Princeton University and graduated in 1953, majoring in psychology. He continued his education at Boston University College of Communication where he earned a MFA in directing and then a PhD from BU's drama department.

Personal
Kirby was born in California, with an identical twin who later collaborated with him on some of his writings. He graduated from Rye High School in New York.  He died of leukemia.

References

 Cambridge Guide to American Theater Edited by Wilmeth, Don B. and Miller, Tice L. Cambridge University Press, 1993 (Short biography up to 1992 included.)
Napoleon, Davi.  Transcending Substance in TheaterWeek November 20, 1995.(Kirby is quoted on the subject of performance studies.)

Notes

1931 births
1997 deaths
Princeton University alumni
Boston University College of Communication alumni
American magazine editors
Deaths from leukemia
New York University faculty
20th-century American male actors
20th-century American non-fiction writers